Dispositif or dispositive is a term used by the French intellectual Michel Foucault, generally to refer to the various institutional, physical, and administrative mechanisms and knowledge structures which enhance and maintain the exercise of power within the social body. The links between these elements are said to be heterogeneous since knowledge, practices, techniques, and institutions are established and reestablished in every age. It is through these links that power relations are structured.

Translation
Dispositif is translated variously, even in the same book, as 'device', 'machinery', 'apparatus', 'construction', and 'deployment'.

Definition 

Foucault uses the term in his 1977 "The Confession of the Flesh" interview, where he answers the question, "What is the meaning or methodological function for you of this term, apparatus (dispositif)?" as follows:

"What I'm trying to pick out with this term is, firstly, a thoroughly heterogeneous ensemble consisting of discourses, institutions, architectural forms, regulatory decisions, laws, administrative measures, scientific statements, philosophical, moral and philanthropic propositions–in short, the said as much as the unsaid. Such are the elements of the apparatus. The apparatus itself is the system of relations that can be established between these elements."

The German linguist Siegfried Jäger defines Foucault's dispositif as

"the interaction of discursive behavior (i. e. speech and thoughts based upon a shared knowledge pool), non-discursive behavior (i. e. acts based upon knowledge), and manifestations of knowledge by means of acts or behaviors .... Dispositifs can thus be imagined as a kind of Gesamtkunstwerk, the complexly interwoven and integrated dispositifs add up in their entirety to a dispositif of all society."

The Danish philosopher Raffnsøe "advances the 'dispositive' (le dispositif) as a key conception in Foucault's work" and "a resourceful approach to the study of contemporary societal problems." According to Raffnsøe, "the dispositionally prescriptive level is a crucial aspect of social reality in organizational life, since it has a determining effect on what is taken for granted and considered real. Furthermore, it determines not only what is and can be considered possible but also what can even be imagined and anticipated as potentially realizable, as something one can hope for, or act to bring about".

Agamben's delineation 
The Italian political philosopher Giorgio Agamben traces the trajectory of the term to Aristotle's oikonomia—the effective management of the household  and the early Church Fathers' attempt to save the concept of the Trinity from the allegation of polytheism, as the triplicity of the God is his oikonomia. 

Agamben defines the apparatus/dispositif as

"Further expanding the already large class of Foucauldian apparatuses, I shall call an apparatus literally anything that has in some way the capacity to capture, orient, determine, intercept, model, control, or secure the gestures, behaviors, opinions, or discourses of living beings. Not only, therefore, prisons, madhouses, the panopticon, schools, confession, factories, disciplines, judicial measures, and so forth (whose connection with power is in a certain sense evident), but also the pen, writing, literature, philosophy, agriculture, cigarettes, navigation, computers, cellular telephones and—why not—language itself, which is perhaps the most ancient of apparatuses—one in which thousands and thousands of years ago a primate inadvertently let himself be captured, probably without realizing the consequences that he was about to face."

The Italian scholar Matteo Pasquinelli criticises Agamben's genealogy with these words

"The dispositif is traced back, theoretically and philologically, to the definition of social normativity that Foucault takes from Canguilhem's The Normal and the Pathological (1966) and to the use of the term dispositif by Canguilhem himself in the essay "Machine and Organism" (1952). Both these lineages proceed from the notion of organic normativity that Canguilhem adopts from the German-Jewish neurologist Kurt Goldstein, that is from a tradition of Lebensphilosophie that appears to be incompatible with Agamben's theological thesis."

See also

Institution
Georges Canguilhem
Disposition

References

Further reading
Foucault, Michel, The History of Sexuality, Volume 1: An Introduction.

Michel Foucault
Philosophy of technology
Postmodern theory
Post-structuralism